Kirsty Elizabeth Howat (born 19 May 1997) is a Scottish footballer who currently plays as a forward for Rangers in the Scottish Women's Premier League.

Career
Howat started her career with youth teams Lochar Thistle, Dumfries and Rangers before debuting with the latter in the Scottish Women's Premier League in 2014. The following year she joined Celtic where she spent two seasons. On 18 January 2018 she moved to rivals and reigning champions Glasgow City, winning her first Scottish Premier League title and also making her debut in the UEFA Women's Champions League. She left the club with twoleague titles and one Scottish Cup medal.

In December 2020, Howat moved to Rangers on a pre-contract arrangement agreed six months earlier, her teammate Sam Kerr made the same switch.

International career
Howat was called up to the national under-16 team for a friendly tournament in Portugal where she made a total of 3 appearances in games against Portugal, Netherlands and Austria, scoring her first goal in the match against Austria. A few months later she was drafted into the under-17 team by coach Pauline Hamill for two friendly games against Wales, scoring on her debut. Howat was a member of the squad that contested the qualifiers for the 2014 European Championship in England; these games were played before the end of 2013 to serve as qualification for the 2014 Costa Rica World Cup which was scheduled for spring 2014. She was then named in the squad for the 2013 European Championship and played in all three matches:  Scotland lost against France 1–0 and Germany 4–2, and drew in the final game against Spain.

In 2014 she was named in the under 19 team and played in the 2014 European Championship Howat played in two of the three matches played by the national team, a 2–0 victory against Belgium and 3–2 defeat against Netherlands, missing the 5–0 loss to Norway. She also played in the 2015 and 2016 European Championship qualification games.

Honours

Club
Glasgow City
 Scottish Women's Premier League: 2018, 2019
 Scottish Women's Cup: 2019

Rangers
 Scottish Women's Premier League: 2021–22
 Scottish Women's Premier League Cup: 2022

References

 

Living people
1997 births
Scottish women's footballers
Women's association football forwards
Scottish Women's Premier League players
Footballers from Dumfries
Glasgow City F.C. players
Celtic F.C. Women players
Rangers W.F.C. players